Leigh Veidman (born 9 June 1988) is an English professional football coach and former player who is an assistant coach of USL Championship club Charleston Battery.

Playing career
His career started with stints at both Liverpool and Everton youth academies. Veidman came to the United States from England to play college soccer in 2008. His first stop was at NJCAA team Iowa Western Community College where he was he earned All-Conference honors in 2008 and 2010 and All-American honors in 2010. He holds the record at Iowa Western for most career goals (41) and most career points (91). Veidman transferred to the NAIA school University of Texas at Brownsville where he earned All-Conference honors in 2011. The last of his college career was played at the NAIA school Bellevue University where he again earned All-Conference honors in 2013.

Veidman's senior level club career included a stint with then USL PDL club Toronto Lynx from 2011 to 2014, and another at then-USL PDL club Des Moines Menace in 2015 and 2016. His last season as a player in the PDL was in 2017 with FC Boulder U23.

Managerial career
Veidman started gaining coaching experience by leading Westside High School in Omaha, Nebraska. Between 2015 and 2017, he was as an assistant coach at Midland University while concurrently coaching as an assistant during the club season for Des Moines Menace.

His break in to coaching at the professional level came with Fresno FC under Adam Smith. After Fresno FC folded, Veidman came on as an assistant coach for Energy FC under John Pascarella. Veidman got his chance to become a head coach when Energy FC let go of Pascarella in June 2021. He won three out of his first four matches as the head coach, more than the club had won in the entire 2020 season. On October 28, 2021, the interim tag was removed and Veidman officially became the Energy's fourth permanent head coach. However, the Energy were put on hiatus for the 2022 season, later extended through at least the 2023 campaign.

On January 30, 2023, Veidman joined the Charleston Battery as an assistant coach.

Career statistics

Managerial

References 

Living people
1988 births
Footballers from Liverpool
English footballers
Association football forwards
Toronto Lynx players
Des Moines Menace players
USL League Two players
English football managers
Association football coaches
High school soccer coaches in the United States
OKC Energy FC coaches
USL Championship coaches
English expatriate footballers
English expatriate football managers
English expatriate sportspeople in the United States
Expatriate soccer players in the United States
Expatriate soccer managers in the United States
University of Texas–Pan American alumni
Iowa Western Reivers men's soccer players
English expatriate sportspeople in Canada
Expatriate soccer players in Canada
Bellevue University alumni
College men's soccer coaches in the United States
USL League Two coaches
Fresno FC coaches
Charleston Battery coaches